Piroheptine (brand name Trimol) is an anticholinergic and antihistamine used as an antiparkinsonian agent.

Piroheptine was observed to prevent the reuptake of dopamine and is therefore a DRI.

Piroheptine comes from a family of drugs that includes Pridefine & Etifelmine.

References 

Antihistamines
Antiparkinsonian agents
Dibenzocycloheptenes
H1 receptor antagonists
Muscarinic antagonists
Pyrrolidines